Cătălin Sorin Ivan (born 23 December 1978) is a Romanian politician, who since the 2009 election has been a Member of the European Parliament for Romania, representing the Social Democratic Party (PSD). Until 2015 he was the Leader of the Romanian delegation to the Progressive Alliance of Socialists and Democrats Group in the European Parliament. Since 2019 he is the President of the Alternativa pentru Demnitate Națională (Alternative for National Dignity) Party.

Parliamentary activities
He was the Vice-Chair of Delegation for relations with the countries of the Andean Community and also a member of the following committees of the European Parliament:
 Committee on Budgetary Control;
 Committee on Culture and Education;
 Delegation to the EU-Turkey Joint Parliamentary Committee;
 Delegation to the Euronest Parliamentary Assembly.

Other work
In 2013, he wrote a letter to the British tabloid newspaper The Daily Express, attacking the paper's campaign against Romanian and Bulgarian immigration to the UK.
He expressed outrage over the negative image being promoted by the Express.

Electoral history

Presidential elections

References

Living people
1978 births
MEPs for Romania 2009–2014
Social Democratic Party (Romania) MEPs
MEPs for Romania 2014–2019
People from Galați